Aras Habib was a colonel in the Free Iraqi Fighters and the long-term director of intelligence for Ahmed Chalabi and the Iraqi National Congress (INC). He may have been the man in charge of the INC’s quest to hunt down former high-level Ba’athists in Iraq, using Ba'athist Party archives they had seized;  in this area information relayed to US-led forces proved far more reliable than the inferences of weapons of mass destruction that had lured the US into Iraq. Chalabi's Pentagon connection, Deputy Defense Secretary Paul Wolfowitz, decided to close off funding following emerging disclosures that some of Chalabi's INC aides supplied sensitive information about U.S. security operations in Baghdad to the Iranian government.

After the US Pentagon's public break with Chalabi surface, a warrant for Aras Habib's arrest was released but not executed. He remains at large.

External links
Entry on History Commons
Chalabi Aides Suspected of Spying for Iran - The Washington Post

Year of birth missing (living people)
Living people
Iraqi Shia Muslims